Effective is a database of predicted bacterial secreted proteins.

See also
 Secreted proteins

References

External links
 http://effectors.org

Biological databases
Protein classification
Bacteriology
Gene expression